In the leadup to the June 2015 general election, various organisations carry out opinion polling to gauge voting intention. Results of such polls are displayed in this article.

The results tend to vary widely, as described in opinion polls in Turkey.

Election poll results

Graphical summary

Poll results
Poll results are listed in the table below in reverse chronological order, showing the most recent first, and using the date the survey's fieldwork was done, as opposed to the date of publication. (Note that, pre 2015 results only indicate the last date of the survey's fieldwork, and not the whole interval.) If such date is unknown, the date of publication is given instead. For the highest percentage figure in each polling survey, the background is shaded in the leading party's colour. The lead column on the right shows the percentage-point difference between the two parties with the highest figures. When a specific poll does not show a data figure for a party, the party's cell corresponding to that poll is shown empty.

2015

2014

2013

2012

2011

Parliamentary seat predictions

Diaspora
Turkish expats living abroad will have the ability to vote for the first time in a Turkish general election. The following table shows the results of polls conducted in different countries amongst Turkish expat voters.

Polling on other issues

A range of opinion polling regarding several contemporary issues which may affect voter choice has also been conducted by several organisations. The results of these are listed below. Please note that some opinion polls may offer different means of wording questions, or may offer different options.

Government corruption scandal

The following table shows opinion polling for whether the 17–25 December 2014 corruption scandal is seen to be a genuine corruption probe, or a plot against the government.

New presidential palace

The following table lists opinions on the construction of a new presidential palace, which has raised controversy due to its size, cost, location and legality.

System of government

The AKP government support a presidential system of government as opposed to the current parliamentary system. Should they win above 330 seats in the next parliament, they have voiced intentions to place several proposed constitutional changes to a referendum, which may include the issue of which government system is used in Turkey. The following polls show the support for parliamentary, presidential and semi-presidential systems.

Economy

The following table lists opinions on how well the government have managed the Turkish economy.

Syrian Civil War

Being one of the hardest hit countries in terms of refugees due to the Syrian Civil War, the Turkish government's policy on Syrian refugees has created controversy, especially in the Hatay Province on the Turkish-Syrian border. The following table shows opinion polling on the support of the government in terms of their policy on Syria.

Foreign policy

The following table shows opinion polling for the approval of the government's foreign policy.

PKK peace process

The government began a peace process with Kurdish separatist militants in 2013, with the PKK militant organisation beginning a withdrawal of insurgents as a result. However, numerous casualties despite the ceasefire as well as the unclear terms of the ceasefire have generated controversy. The following table shows opinion polling on the approval of the government's solution process.

Judicial independence

Following the 2013 government corruption scandal and the subsequent crackdown by the government on the judiciary, the independence of the judiciary has been a key issue of concern for the political opposition and the European Union. The following table shows opinion polling on whether or not the judiciary is independent.

Alevi rights

Alevi Muslims are the main religious minority in Turkey. The table below shows opinion polling on whether Alevi citizens should have greater rights, such as granting official status to their place of worship, the Cemevi.

Islamic State of Iraq and the Levant and Kobanî

The following table shows the approval for the government's policy on tackling the Islamic State of Iraq and the Levant in Iraq and Syria. This particularly centres around the situation in the border town of Kobanî, where Turkish inaction caused deadly protests, as well as the government's permission for Kurdish Peshmerga forces to cross Turkish territory to fight in Kobanî.

Workers' rights

The following table shows opinion polling for whether workers' rights are sufficient. This issue rose to prominence after 301 miners were killed in Soma, Manisa after a mine collapsed. Subsequent deaths in the construction and mining sector have also caused debate on workers' rights in Turkey, which are rated amongst the worst in the world.

Gezi protests

The following table shows opinion polling for the protests that took place in the summer of 2013 against the construction plan of a shopping mall in Taksim Gezi Park.

Leadership approval ratings

The following tables show the approval ratings for key politicians in Turkey, most of whom will be seeking re-election in the 2015 general election. The tick icon indicates approval, the X icon indicates disapproval, while N/O indicates no opinion.

See also
Opinion polls in Turkey

References

Notes

Turkey
June 2015 Turkish general election
2015 1